Lasiopetalum parviflorum is a species of flowering plant in the family Malvaceae and is endemic to south-eastern continental Australia. It is a shrub with rusty-hairy stems, more or less glabrous leaves with the edges rolled under, and greenish to cream-coloured flowers.

Description
The lower surface of the leaves is densely covered with grey and rust-coloured, star-shaped hairs. Flowering occurs in spring and the fruit is a woolly-hairy capsule  in diameter.

Taxonomy
Lasiopetalum parviflorum was first formally described in 1811 by Edward Rudge in Transactions of the Linnean Society of London. The specific epithet (parviflorum) means "small-flowered".

Distribution and habitat
This lasiopetalum grows in grassy woodland and forest on the coast and nearby ranges of New South Wales and south-eastern Queensland.

References

parviflorum
Malvales of Australia
Flora of New South Wales
Flora of Queensland
Plants described in 1811
Taxa named by Edward Rudge